Qaradonlu is a village and municipality in the Imishli District of Azerbaijan.  It has a population of 1,185.

Notable natives 
Sayyad Aran, Azerbaijani socio-figure; one of the founders of New Azerbaijan Party (NAP); First deputy chairman of the State Committee on Religious Associations of the Republic of Azerbaijan since 16 November 2012.

References

External links 

Populated places in Imishli District